"Enough to Make a Pair of Sailor's Trousers" is the sixth television play episode of the second season of the Australian anthology television series Australian Playhouse. "Enough to Make a Pair of Sailor's Trousers" originally aired on ABC on 24 July 1967 in Melbourne and on 28 August 1967

Plot
Beatrice, a shy and lonely country girl moves to the city. She falls for Henry, a sailor who shows her "a patch of blue".

Cast
 Helen Morse as Beatrice
 Allen Bickford as Henry the sailor
 Heather Christie as Beatrice's sister Irene
 June Prichard
 Gray Shearston
 Mary Mackay
 Judy Banks 
 Dalvern Thorn

Production
The title came from the old country saying that when there is enough blue sky to cut out bell bottomed breeches the worst of the storm is over.

It is believed to be the first drama production shot at Garden Island where H.M.A.S. Vendetta, a destroyer, is moored, and also at the Sydney Opera House.

Reception
The Age called it "enjoyable". Filmink called it "charming".

References

External links
 
 
 Complete script at National Archives of Australia

1967 television plays
1967 Australian television episodes
1960s Australian television plays
Australian Playhouse (season 2) episodes